Steinheii  is a mountain in the municipality of Bykle in Agder county, Norway. The mountain sits in the southwestern part of the municipality, just south of the lake Botsvatn and east of the lake Ytre Storevatnet.

See also
List of mountains of Norway

References

Bykle
Mountains of Agder